Fussball Club Basel 1893, widely known as FC Basel, FCB, or just Basel, is a Swiss football club based in Basel, in the Canton of Basel-Stadt. Formed in 1893, the club has been Swiss national champions 20 times, Swiss Cup winners 13 times, and Swiss League Cup winners once.

Basel have competed in European competitions every season since 1999–2000. They have qualified for the Group stages of the Champions League more times than any other Swiss club – a total of seven times – and are the only Swiss club to have ever qualified to the Group stages directly. In 2021 they set the new record for a Swiss team with the most successful international group stage campaign by reaching 14 points in their Conference League group.

Since 2001, the club has played its home games at St. Jakob-Park, built on the site of their previous home, St. Jakob Stadium. Their home colours are red and blue, leading to a nickname of "RotBlau".

History

Foundation
FC Basel was started by an advertisement placed by Roland Geldner in the 12 November 1893 edition of the Basler national newspaper, requesting that a football team be formed and that anyone who wished to join should meet up the following Wednesday at 8:15 in the restaurant Schuhmachern-Zunft. Eleven men attended the meeting, generally from the academic community, founding Fussball Club Basel on 15 November 1893.

Founder members
(Source: the documentation to the club's 50th anniversary)
 Emil Abderhalden was first team player in the early days, a famous physiologist and head of the physiological institute at the University of Halle in Germany. 
 Max Born nothing is known about his private life. 
 Josy Ebinger was long-time player in the first team. He was active as a club official in various offices, club chairman from October 1902 to May 1903. He was vice president of the Swiss Football Association in 1900.
 Max Geldner played at least six games for the club's first team in the first two years and was still a loyal friend and a patron of FC Basel 50 years later. 
 Roland Geldner was the first president of FC Basel. He was a well-known personality in the city and football player from the early days of football. A distinguished person, he was the soul of the club in the early years. 
 Wilhelm Glaser wore the red and blue colors as a center forward for years, played at least 14 matches. He was still follower with great interest of the FC Basel activities 50 years later
 Jean Grieder was first and second team player, with at least one match for the first team. He was asset and liability manager and became the clubs first actuary. For years he held high honorary positions in his hometown. 
 Ferdinand Isler was a professor at the canton school in Frauenfeld. He was the first teams first captain, played at least 17 games during the clubs first three seasons. He later became actuary of the club. He was a great propagandist. He wrote brochures about the football game and translated the English rules of the game into German. He was one of the first sports journalists. 
 Wilhelm Oser was pharmacist by profession. His cheerful, spirited manner was highly valued in the club. An avid pioneer of the football movement. 
 Fritz Schäublin for many years he was the highly respected rector of the humanistic grammar school in Basel. With his excellent skills he served the club in various offices for many years. He was an excellent player in the early days, played four matches in the club's first two season. He was founder of the tennis department. 
 Lucien Schmoll nothing is known about his private life. 
 Richard Strub was still and quite, loyal member of the club. Very little is known about his private life.
 John Tollmann was a proficient goalkeeper and played at least 23 matches during the club's first five years. He was the first secretary-treasurer of the Swiss Football Association. A personality with a very special character. Together with Roland Geldner, he was the club's driving force in the early days. 
 Charlie Volderauer was an excellent defender and played at least 33 matches. He was president December 1896 to December 1899. Arranged the first games in Switzerland against English professionals: Newcastle United and Celtic Glasgow. A rarely eager club member.

Fussball Club Basel 1893 has a long and illustrious history, that spans the period from 1893 to the present day. Having competed at the highest level of football in Switzerland for most of this time, FCB currently play in the Swiss Super League. The club was founded on 15 November 1893. At first the club played their home games in the Landhof stadium. During the mid- 1960's Basel then played their games in St. Jakob Stadium which was demolished in 1998. During the construction of the new stadium, between 1998 and 2001, the Stadion Schützenmatte was the clubs temporary home ground. Since 2001 Basel play home games at St. Jakob-Park, which is currently the largest club stadium in Switzerland.

The history of FC Basel

Due to its size the history of FC Basel has been divided into five sections. For details on individual periods of the club's history, see the following articles:

 History of FC Basel (1893–1918)
The first section deals with the foundation, the early years, the forming of the Swiss Football Association (ASF-SFV), the first league championships and the years up to and during the first World War.

 History of FC Basel (1918–1939)
The second section is about the period between the two World Wars and the introduction of the Swiss Cup. FCB did not have much of an early footballing success; it took them 40 years to win their first trophy, winning the cup in 1933, as they defeated arch-rivals and reigning cup-holders Grasshopper Club Zürich in the final.

 History of FC Basel (1939–1965)
The third section starts with relegation, no promotion, missed promotion, promotion after all, another relegation, another promotion and the second cup title. It then spans the period of Jules Düblin as chairman, the first championship title and the third cup win.

 History of FC Basel (1965–2000)
Under the motto rise and fall, the fourth section deals with the era Benthaus, seven domestic league titles, the subsequent decline, relegation, six seasons of second-tier football and the long-awaited promotion.

 History of FC Basel (2000–present)
The fifth section deals with the financial backing that had been put into the club at that time, the move to the new stadium St. Jakob-Park, how success returned and how things have progressed to the present day.

Supporters and rivalries

Fans

FC Basel is known for having a big and loyal local following. When polls are conducted about the most passionate club football fans, FC Basel's fans usually make the top 200 if not top 100 in the world, resulting in what is by far the highest average attendance in Switzerland with around 30,000 fans attending every home game and with the new extension being built that number is expected to rise to around 40,000. The fans have also made themselves a name in numerous international matches in recent years. World tennis legend Roger Federer is one of the club's most famous fans.

In November 2010 their supporters caused the game against FC Luzern to be stopped after they threw hundreds of tennis balls onto the pitch. This was in protest at the kick off times being moved to accommodate a tennis tournament on the TV schedule.

Rivalry
The city of Basel and the city of Zürich have a long-standing rivalry. Therefore, FCB's most traditional and fiercest rivals are Grasshopper Club Zürich and FC Zürich. In the past few seasons, the rivalry between FC Zürich and Basel has been fueled by Zürich's narrow league championship wins over Basel. Supporters from both sides have caused trouble in the past years, with the worst incident happening in May 2006. Basel had won the league in 2003–04 and 2004–05 and were set to make it three in a row if they won or drew against Zürich at home on the last day of the 2005–06 season. Zürich took the lead after a late goal from Iulian Filipescu and consequently won the match and the league. After the final whistle, players and fans from both teams started fighting on the pitch and in the stands. This incident has fueled hatred and bitterness between fans from FC Zürich and FC Basel. There is controversy about which rivalry is bigger, the one with Grasshopper or FC Zürich, but it usually depends on the success of these teams.

Stadium

FC Basel play their home games at the 37,500 capacity St. Jakob-Park.

UEFA have awarded the stadium a 4-star rating, the highest rating that could be given to a stadium of that capacity. St. Jakob-Park was opened in 2001, originally holding a maximum attendance of 33,433. The stadium was expanded with a new stand (sector G) and upgraded to 42,500 due to Switzerland co-hosting UEFA Euro 2008. After Euro 2008, a number of seats were removed, thus giving more space between them, and the capacity was reduced 37,500 seats. The stadium is nicknamed "Joggeli" by the fans and has two restaurants, Restaurant UNO and Hattrick's Sports Bar, as well as a shopping centre which opened on 1 November 2001. It also has parking space for 680 cars and has its own train station. St. Jakob-Park hosted six matches during Euro 2008, including the opening game between Switzerland and Czech Republic, and a semi-final between Germany and Turkey. The most interesting feature of the stadium is the translucent outer layer, which can be illuminated in different colours for impressive effects; this effect was copied three years later for Bayern Munich's new stadium, the Allianz Arena.

Before St. Jakob-Park was built, FC Basel played home games in the Landhof (in the Quarter Kleinbasel) and, following the 1954 FIFA World Cup, in the newly built St. Jakob Stadium which was on the same site as the current stadium. During the construction period of St. Jakob-Park, Basel's home matches were played at the Stadion Schützenmatte.

In 2016, the UEFA Europa League final was played at St. Jakob-Park.

Affiliated clubs
  FC Concordia Basel – FC Basel are the parent-club of local side Concordia who currently play in the 1. Liga Classic. Many of Basel's youth players, such as Patrik Baumann, Beg Ferati and Simone Grippo, have had loan spells there. Basel have also signed a number players from Concordia, like Louis Crayton and Murat Yakin. Miroslav König, Riccardo Meili, André Muff and Dominik Ritter are just a few ex-Basel players who have gone on to play for Concordia.
 Chennai City FC – FC Basel owns 26% of the club.

Colours and logo
FC Basel's traditional kit is a red and blue shirt. Due to the fact that some of the founders were members of the "Basler Ruder-Club", whose colors were red and blue, they adopted those colours for their new club. FC Basel's outfit is completed by blue shorts with gold trim and blue socks with red trim. From this comes the nickname "RotBlau" which is Swiss German and German for "RedBlue". Their away kit is all white with two stripes down the middle, the left being red and the right being blue. FC Basel's kits were formerly manufactured by Nike, however in the summer of 2012 a new contract was formed with Adidas to produce the kits until 2017. The main sponsor is Novartis, a multinational pharmaceutical company which is based in the city of Basel. On the inside tag of the jerseys is inscribed "Rot isch unseri Liebi, Blau die ewigi Treui, Basel unseri Stadt." This roughly translates to "Red is our love, blue the eternal loyalty, Basel our city."

The famous "Blaugrana" colours of Barcelona are said to have originated from the Rotblau colours of FC Basel. FC Barcelona was founded by former Basel captain Joan Gamper. For the 2008–09 season, Basel changed their shirt to resemble the traditional Barcelona shirt (red and blue vertical stripes). Barcelona changed theirs to one half of the shirt red, the other blue, which happens to resemble the traditional Basel shirt.

Basel's current logo is a shield, the left half red and the right half blue. The shield is outlined with gold and in the centre in gold letters it reads "FCB", for "Football Club Basel" or "Fussballclub Basel". The logo is worn in the centre of the shirt opposed to on the traditional left-hand side. Like the club colours of Basel, the logo has a striking resemblance to that of Barcelona's. There are theories that suggest that the founder of Barcelona, being at one time the captain of Basel, reincorporated the logo of Basel to that of Barcelona. The resemblances seem clear: both logos seem to incorporate the shield design, as do most other clubs. Most notably, however, is the FCB acronyms on both logos and the red-blue colours, outlined in gold. Additionally, the football that lies on the left side of the Basel logo seems to be the exact shape, type and colour as that of the Barcelona logo in the bottom centre. Because of this, many say that Basel was the inspiration in the process of founding Barcelona.

Records
 Highest stage reached in Champions League: Round of 16 (2002–03, 2011–12, 2014–15, 2017–18)
 Highest stage reached in UEFA Europa League: Semi-finals (2012–13), quarter-finals (2013–14, 2019–20)
 Highest stage reached in UEFA Europa Conference League: quarter-finals (2022–23)
 Biggest European home win: Basel 7–0  Folgore (24 August 2000, UEFA Cup qualifying round second leg)
 Biggest European away win:  Fram 0–5 Basel (18 September 1973, European Champion Clubs' Cup first round first leg)
 Biggest European home defeat: Basel 0–5  Barcelona (22 October 2008, UEFA Champions League)
 Biggest European away defeat:  Bayern Munich 7–0 Basel (13 March 2012, UEFA Champions League knockout stage)
 Most league appearances:  Massimo Ceccaroni (398)
 Most league goals:  Josef Hügi (244)
 Record number of consecutive home games unbeaten: 59 (February 2003 to May 2006)
 Record number of consecutive unbeaten games: 26 (2011–12)
 Highest home game attendance (St. Jakob Stadium): 60,000
 Highest home game attendance (St. Jakob-Park): 42,500
 Most capped foreign player:  Teófilo Cubillas, 81 caps, Peru
 Most capped Swiss player:  Alexander Frei, 82 caps

Individual records, league
Updated to league matches played on 22 May 2022.

Individual records, all competitions
Updated to all matches played on 22 May 2022.

Honours

National 
Swiss Championship: 20
 1952–53, 1966–67, 1968–69, 1969–70, 1971–72, 1972–73, 1976–77, 1979–80, 2001–02, 2003–04, 2004–05, 2007–08, 2009–10, 2010–11, 2011–12, 2012–13, 2013–14, 2014–15, 2015–16, 2016–17
Swiss Cup: 13
 1932–33, 1946–47, 1962–63, 1966–67, 1974–75, 2001–02, 2002–03, 2006–07, 2007–08, 2009–10, 2011–12, 2016–17, 2018–19
Swiss League Cup: 1
 1972

International
UEFA Champions League
 Quarter-finalists: 1973–74
 Last 16: 2011–12, 2014–15, 2017–18
UEFA Europa League
 Semi-finalists: 2012–13
 Quarter-finalists: 2013–14, 2019–20
UEFA Europa Conference League
 Last 16: 2021–22, 2022–23

European record
As of 13 August 2019.

Ownership

FC Basel Holding AG
The FC Basel Holding AG owns 75% of FC Basel 1893 AG and the other 25% is owned by the club FC Basel 1893 members. The club FC Basel 1893 functions as a base club independent of the holding company and the AG. FC Basel 1893 AG is responsible for the operational business of the club, e.g. the 1st team, a large part of the youth department and the back office are affiliated there. All decisions that affect the club FC Basel 1893 are made within the AG.

On 11 May 2021 the FC Basel Holding AG chairman Bernhard Burgener and board member David Degen announced a transfer of ownership rights, after months of massive fan protests. The new situation meant Degen owned 92% of the shares and about 8% is held by four small investors.  At the AGM of FC Basel Holding AG on 15 June 2021, Bernhard Burgener, Peter von Büren and Karl Odermatt stood down from the board of directors. A new board of directors stood for election. From that date the board consisted of Reto Baumgartner (president), Dani Büchi (delegate of the board), David Degen (vice-president), Johannes Barth, Marco Gadola, Christian Gross, Sophie Herzog and Andreas Rey. Degen said he will sell a part of the shares within his management team.

On 18 August the Holding AG announced how the shares had been divided between the shareholders. Degen himself kept 40%, Andreas Rey held 18,41%, his wife Ursula Rey-Krayer also held 18,41%. A group of four other investors, these being Johannes Barth, Marco Gadola, Dani Büchi and Dan Holzmann, together held 15,14%. The other 8,04% of the shares remained by another group of investors, these being Manor AG, J. Safra Sarasin, Novasearch AG, MCH Group AG and Weitnauer Holding AG.

On 27 December 2021 an extraordinary AGM of the Holding AG was held and it was announced that the Board had reorganised itself. Ursula Rey-Krayer and Dan Holzmann were unanimously elected to the board of directors. At the same time, Sophie Herzog, Christian Gross, Johannes Barth and Reto Baumgartner resigned from the Board and were to focus upon their duties as members of the Board of Directors of FC Basel 1893 AG.

Since that date the new Board of the FC Basel Holding AG consists of the following members: David Degen (president), Dani Büchi (delegate of the board), Marco Gadola, Dan Holzmann, Ursula Rey-Krayer and Andreas Rey (vice-president). With the meeting FC Basel Holding AG had an adjusted composition - the FCB shareholders were represented upon the Board of Directors of FC Basel Holding AG by those with the overall largest proportion.

The Board of Directors of the FC Basel 1893 AG as it was announced in June 2021: Reto Baumgartner, (president), Johannes Barth. David Degen (vice-president), Carol Etter (delegate of the club), Marco Gadola, Christian Gross, Sophie Herzog and Andreas Rey.

Club management 
The club's 127th AGM tookk place in written form, during the week from Saturday 5 June and Friday 11 June. The results were communicated on Monday 14 June. On 13 April 2021 the club announced their proposal for the club management. Club president Reto Baumgartner and the two directors, Dominik Donzé and Benno Kaiser, remained in the board and three new members were elected. These three being Carol Etter (sports lawyer), Edward Turner (financial specialist) and Tobias Adler (marketingspecialist). Their exact roles are to be decided. Carol Etter was elected as delegate of the board, to represent the club at the meetings of the Holding.

Team management 
On 20 May 2021 the club announced that Patrick Rahmen had signed a new contract that made him head coach of the new FCB first team. Since 6 April he had been interim coach. Assistant coach Ognjen Zaric also prolonged his contract for the new season. Massimo Colomba stayed with the club as Goalkeeper Coach. On 15 June 2021 the club announced, that Michael Silberbauer had been hired on a deal for the 2021–22 season, as the clubs new assistant coach under head coach Rahmen.

The club announced on 31 December, that the contract with head coach Patrick Rahmen had been extended for a further year until summer 2023. Jointly the club and Rahmen had decided to sign on Boris Smiljanic as new assistant coach. The 32-year-old Spaniard Guillermo Abascal also joined the coaching team and work together with Ognjen Zaric as special coach. It was also announced that Michael Silberbauer had left the club by mutual agreement.

Following a number of bad results for the U-21 team, on 30 November the club had announced that with immediate effect FC Basel 1893 and its U-21 coach Marco Schällibaum had separated. On 3 January 2022 FCB announced that they had signed Michel Renggli as new coach for their U-21 team.

On 21 February, the club announced Patrick Rahmen's termination, due to "unsatisfactory sportive development of the team and lack of clear perspective". He is replaced by Guille Abascal in the interim. Furthermore, assistant coach Boris Smiljanic asked to dissolve his contract due to personal reasons. He is replaced by Marco Walker, who had most recently coached FC Sion. 

Former players Alex Frei and Davide Callà were announced as the new coach and assistant coach, respectively, for the upcoming 2022-23 season. Both of them had previously played for Basel: Frei between 2009 and 2013 and Callà between 2014 and 2018. Together, the two of them led FC Winterthur to promotion in the 2021-22 Swiss Challenge League.

Players

Current squad

Players out on loan

Retired numbers

Women's team

Since 2009 Basel have a women's team. It competes in the Nationalliga A.

Superleague Formula

FC Basel had a team in the Superleague Formula race car series where football teams lent their name to cars. GU-Racing International has operated the car for all seasons and Max Wissel has driven the car in all the races. FC Basel and Wissel won one race, in the 2009 season at Donington Park. The team have scored three other podiums in the series.

Youth system
Basel is known throughout Switzerland for having a good youth system. It has produced Swiss internationals such as Erni Maissen, Adrian Knup, Alexander Frei, Marco Streller, Philipp and David Degen. Since Basel moved into the St. Jakob-Park in 2001, they have strengthened their youth academy and many young talents like the Felipe Caicedo, Ivan Rakitić, Zdravko Kuzmanović, Xherdan Shaqiri, Yann Sommer, Eren Derdiyok and Mohammed Salah have risen through the ranks there. Since 2001, more than 40 successful players have risen through the Basel youth system and joined their first team, including:

Under-19 team

There is no official Basel U-19 team, because a U-19 championship does not exist in Swiss football. The team was quickly put together in the 2011–12 season from the youngest members of the first team, the younger Under-21 and the Under-18 teams who were eligible to play in the 2011–12 NextGen Series. 

Because Basel qualified for the 2013–14 UEFA Champions League, the Under-19 team was again called to life and played in the 2013–14 UEFA Youth League. This time the members of this squad were solely members from the U-21 and U-18 teams, but the team only trained together once a week.  A year later Basel qualified for the 2014–15 UEFA Champions League. Therefore, they were eligible to play in the 2014–15 UEFA Youth League and they took the matter a lot more seriously than the year before. Reserve team manager Thomas Häberli was also appointed as U-19 coach. Häberli's U-19 squad was still a mix between the younger U-21 and the older U-18 teams, but the team had training together virtually daily. This resulted with improved results, the team winning four games from their six, but failing to qualify for the knockout phase on tiebreak. 

Basel's first team qualified for the Champions League again in 2016–17, so the U-19 team was revived for the 2016–17 UEFA Youth League. Raphaël Wicky was U-19 coach. In the group stage they reached second position and advanced to the play-offs, but lost this against Rosenborg. 

Arjan Peço is the team coach in the 2017–18 UEFA Youth League. The team will advance to the next round.

Other youth teams
The club also have 12 further youth teams: Under-18, Under-17 (Team Basel/Jura), Under-16, Under-15, Under-14, Under-13 (Footeco), Under-12 (Junioren D9 Promotion), Under-11 (Junioren Ea), Under-10 (Junioren Eb), Under-9 (Junioren F), Under-8 (Junioren F) and Bebbi (Under-7).

Employees of note

Former players

Coaches

NOTE: Early history is largely unknown.

  Percy Humphreys (1913–14)
  Walter Dietrich (1919–22)
  Max Breunig (1922–23)
  Gyula Kertész (1928–30)
  Gustav Putzendopler (1930–32)
  Otto Haftl (1932)
  Karl Kurz (1932–33)
  Josef Haist (1933–34)
  Richard (Dombi) Kohn (1934)
  Alwin Riemke (1934–36)
  Heinz Körner (1936–37)
  Fernand Jaccard (1937–39)
  Walter Dietrich (1939)
  Max Galler (1939–40)
  Eugen Rupf (1940–43)
  Willy Wolf (1943–46)
  Max Barras (1946)
  Anton Schall (1946–47)
  Ernst Hufschmid (1947–52)
  René Bader (1952–55)
  Willy Dürr (1955)
  Béla Sárosi (1955–57)
  Rudi Strittich (1957–58)
  René Bader (1958–59)
  Jenő Vincze (1 July 1959 – 30 June 61)
  Georges Sobotka (1961–65)
  Helmut Benthaus (1 July 1965 – 30 June 82)
  Rainer Ohlhauser (1982–83)
  Ernst August Künnecke (1983–85)
  Emil Müller (1985)
  Helmut Benthaus (1 July 1985 – 30 June 87)
  Urs Siegenthaler (1 July 1987 – 30 June 90)
  Ernst August Künnecke (1990–92)
  Karl Odermatt and  Bruno Rahmen (1992)
  Friedel Rausch (1 July 1992 – 30 June 93)
  Claude Andrey (1993–95)
  Karl Engel (1995–97)
  Heinz Hermann (22 March 1997 – 31 March 97)
  Salvatore Andracchio (interim), (1 April 1997 – 30 June 97)
  Jörg Berger (1 July 1997 – 6 October 97)
  Salvatore Andracchio (interim), (7 October 1997 – 31 December 97)
  Guy Mathez (1 Jan 1998 – 14 May 99)
  Marco Schällibaum (15 May 1999 – 14 June 99)
  Christian Gross (15 June 1999 – 30 June 2009)
  Thorsten Fink (1 July 2009 – 16 October 11)
  Heiko Vogel (interim) (13 October 2011 – 11 December 11)
  Heiko Vogel (12 December 2011 – 15 October 12)
  Murat Yakin (15 October 2012 – 17 May 2014)
  Paulo Sousa (1 July 2014 – 17 June 2015)
  Urs Fischer (18 June 2015 – 3 June 2017)
  Raphaël Wicky (4 June 2017 – 26 July 2018)
  Alexander Frei (interim) (26 July 2018 – 2 August 2018)
  Marcel Koller (2 August 2018 – 31 August 2020)
  Ciriaco Sforza (1 September 2020 – 6 April 2021)
  Patrick Rahmen (6 April 2021 – 21 February 2022)
  Guille Abascal (interim) (21 February 2022 – 23 May 2022)
  Alex Frei (23 May 2022 – 7 February 2023)
  Heiko Vogel (interim) (7 February 2023 - Present)

President

 Roland Geldner (1893–1896)
 Emanuel Schiess (1896–1896)
 Charlie Volderauer (1896–1899)
 Ernst-Alfred Thalmann ( 1900–1901)
 Emanuel Schiess (1901–1902)
 Ernst-Alfred Thalmann (1902–1902)
 Josy Ebinger (1902–1903)
 Ernst-Alfred Thalmann (1903–1907)
 Siegfried Pfeiffer (1907–1908)
 Ernst-Alfred Thalmann (1908–1913)
 Karl Ibach (1913–1913)
 Carl Albert Hintermann (1913–1914)
 Ernst-Alfred Thalmann (1914–1915)
 Philipp Leichner (1915–1915)
 Franz Rinderer (1915–1918)
 August Rossa (1918–1919)
 Bernard Klingelfuss (1919–1920)
 Franz Rinderer (1920–1921)
 Carl Burkhardt (1921–1922)
 Karl Ibach (1922–1925)
 Carl Burkhardt (1925–1926)
 Franz Rinderer (1926–1927)
 Karl Ibach (1927–1927)
 Karl Junker (1927–1927)
 Hans Rupprecht (1927–1929)
 Otto Kuhn (1929–1931)
 Franz Rinderer (1931–1936)
 Emil Junker (1936–1939)
 Albert Besse (1939–1944)
 Emil Junker (1944–1946)
 Jules Düblin (1946–1959)
 Ernst Weber (1959–1962)
 Lucien Schmidlin (1962–1966)
 Harry Thommen (1966–1970)
 Félix Musfeld (1970–1976)
 René Theler (1976–1980)
 Pierre Jacques Lieblich (1980–1982)
 Roland Rasi (1982–1983)
 Urs Gribi (1983–1986)
 Peter Max Sutter (1986–1987)
 Charles Röthlisberger (1987–1992)
 Peter Epting (1992–1996)
 René C. Jäggi (1996–2002)
 Werner Edelmann (2002–2006)
 Gisela Oeri (2006–2011)
 Bernhard Heusler (2012–2017)
 Bernhard Burgener (2017–2020)
 Reto Baumgartner (2020–)

At the club's Extraordinary General Assembly on 16 January 2012 the 601 attending members appointed Oeri as honorary president.

See also
 History of FC Basel
 List of FC Basel players
 List of FC Basel seasons
 Football in Switzerland
 The Football Club Social Alliance

Notes and references

Notes

References

External links

 Rotblau.ch Statistics 
 FC Basel at Soccerway
 

 
Basel
Basel
Multi-sport clubs in Switzerland
1893 establishments in Switzerland